Difford is a surname. Notable people with the surname include:

 Archibald Difford (1883–1918), South African first-class cricketer
 Chris Difford (born 1954), English singer, musician and songwriter

Fictional characters
 Pastor Jeff Difford, a character in Young Sheldon, portrayed by Matt Hobby